The Dakota Southern Railway  is a railroad that until late May 2021 ran  between Kadoka, South Dakota, and Mitchell, South Dakota, and which continues to service the approximately  of remaining active track of the Napa Junction–Platte Line in southern South Dakota.  It connects with the BNSF Railway in Mitchell and Napa Junction respectively.

History
The Mitchell–Kadoka line is part of a former Chicago, Milwaukee, St. Paul and Pacific Railroad (CMStP&P) secondary built between Marquette, Iowa and Rapid City, South Dakota during the period of 1880 and 1907. The line lost profitability and was embargoed  in 1980 and subsequently bought by the South Dakota Department of Transportation, which still owns the tracks.  The purchase was orchestrated by Governor Bill Janklow.

Dakota Southern also operated a line  from Napa Junction to Platte, South Dakota, which was also constructed and owned by the Chicago, Milwakuee, St. Paul and Pacific Railroad. The operation lasted from 1985 to 1989 before Dakota Southern stopped operating the line. Dakota Southern has since reinstated operations on this line as far as Tabor, almost 30 years after the last train left the line.

The railway originally hauled large amounts of grain, but this business became unprofitable in the late 1990s. Between 2000 and 2007, the railway had just one customer—a box factory in Mitchell, and thus no trains passed that point. In 2005, however, the railway obtained a haulage agreement with BNSF to allow it to operate to Sioux City, where it could interchange with the Union Pacific Railroad and the Canadian National Railway, making grain service profitable again.  After track repairs, service briefly resumed as far as Presho, South Dakota in fall 2007. While the line still officially operates all the way to Kadoka, as the Kadoka-Rapid City portion was rail-banked in 1996,  a grade crossing in Vivian is currently paved over, as well as one in Belvidere.

New ownership and revitalization of the line
On October 1, 2009, new owners Mike Williams and Stan Patterson took over the day-to-day operations of the railroad. They both own other rail lines in the country.  Mike Williams owns the Bountiful Grain and Craig Mountain Railroad, Ozark Valley Railroad and the Iowa River Railroad. Stan Patterson operates the Washington and Idaho Railway.  Initially they planned to rehabilitate the line as far as Murdo, 140 miles west of Mitchell, over three years.  The first year was to be from Mitchell to White Lake, the second year to Chamberlain and in the third year rehabilitation would be carried out to Murdo.

In spring 2011 a 16-million-dollar federal Tiger grant was secured to help finance the 28-million-dollar rebuild of 61.6 miles of the line between Mitchell and Chamberlain. Work began in late May 2011. According to former railroad owner Alex Huff, the 65-pound rail was to be replaced with 136, 132 and 115-pound rail. As a result of the rebuilding, two competing companies proposed building 110-car shuttle loading facilities near Kimball, South Dakota. In mid-September 2012 the first regularly scheduled service west of Mitchell since the late 1990s began with twice weekly unit trains of inbound fertilizer and outbound grain to the newly built Liberty Grain elevator east of Kimball.

In fall 2014 Dakota Southern received a Federal Tiger grant to help fund rebuilding an additional 42 miles of the line from Chamberlain to one mile west of Presho. South Dakota Wheat Growers started construction on an agronomy services and shuttle loader facility in the fall of 2014 in Kennebec. The reconstructed line opened and the first 115-car shuttle train arrived and was loaded in Kennebec in October 2016.

Before being rehabilitated the line carried 687 cars in 2010, 3,049 cars in 2013 after rehabilitation between Mitchell and Chamberlain and 9,580 in 2017 after rehabilitation to Presho.

In 2018, Dakota Southern had expressed interest in rehabilitating the line to Murdo, and possibly beyond all the way to Kadoka.

Platte Line operator
In September 2015, 27 years after Dakota Southern stopped operating the line, Dakota Southern was chosen by the State Railway Board to again operate the long out-of-service Napa Junction – Platte line in southern South Dakota. In November 2016, the South Dakota Railway Board agreed with terms on a 10-year contract with Dakota Southern to lease and restore service between Napa Junction and Ravinia. Plans were made to replace 2,000 ties so that the railroad could operate the first 10 miles of track, as far as Tabor, within 30 days. As of November 2021 Google Maps showed that tanker cars were stored on the line as far west as the Tabor elevator. Grade crossings in Tabor were paved over. In addition a 40-million-dollar Dakota Plains Ag Center grain facility opened in 2017 at Napa Junction.

In June 2020 the South Dakota Railway Board agreed to ask the federal Surface Transportation Board to railbank 33 miles of the Platte Line between Tyndall and Ravinia. The remainder of the line beyond Ravinia to Platte had already been railbanked. If approved the ties and rails would be removed and salvaged and Dakota Southern Railway's lease amended to end at Tyndall.

The South Dakota DOT had previously authorized sale of the Platte Line to investors in a proposed ethanol plant in Wagner in 2006, but the sale fell through and the authorization was withdrawn in 2011.

Sale of the Mitchell - Kadoka line to Watco
On February 17, 2021 the South Dakota State Railway Board authorized the South Dakota Department of Transportation to sell the Mitchell - Kadoka line to Watco, doing business as Ringneck and Western Railroad, LLC, for $13,000,000. The railroad committed to spending $2,000,000 yearly on maintenance for 10 years and to complete a passing siding near Kimball. The sale agreement also included a repurchase agreement in the event of abandonment or discontinuance of service.

Locomotive roster

 Dakota Southern 37, an EMD SD38 ex-McCloud Railway, non-operational following severe electrical damage in early 2019
 Dakota Southern 75, a GE 70-ton switcher ex-Sisseton Southern, stored with two other unnumbered 70-tonners
 Dakota Southern 103, an ALCO S3 stored
 Dakota Southern 213, an ALCO Century 420 needs traction motor; sold to A&M in 2022
 Dakota Southern 506, an EMD SD9 stored
 Dakota Southern 512, an EMD SD7 operational
 Dakota Southern 522, an EMD SD7 scrapped
 Dakota Southern 4427, an EMD SD9E operational
 Dakota Southern 719, an EMD GP30 used for parts. Ex-Wisconsin Central nee-Soo Line
 Dakota Southern 3000, an EMD SD40-2 ex-Western Rail Inc, nee-Union Pacific
 Union Pacific 6925, an EMD DDA40X, inoperable and stored in Chamberlain. Since sold to a private owner.

Controversy 
In December 2017, Dakota Southern Railway was found to have stored rail cars full of liquid natural gas, more commonly known as butane, on a siding at the South Dakota Wheat Growers facility in Kennebec. A federal inspection found that they had been sitting there far too long, and cited 11 counts of hazardous material violations.

Further investigation found that Mike Willams, one of the co-owners of Dakota Southern, had signed a contract giving away 1.4 miles of siding to Bruce Terminaling LLC, a company that Mike Willams also owns. This contract was not presented to the South Dakota State Rail Board, and due to this, a discussion about terminating the lease of Dakota Southern on the Rapid City–Mitchell (MRC) line came about, but this never came to fruition.

References

South Dakota railroads
Switching and terminal railroads
Spin-offs of the Chicago, Milwaukee, St. Paul and Pacific Railroad